This is a list of Latin verbs with English derivatives and those derivatives.

Ancient orthography did not distinguish between i and j or between u and v. Many modern works distinguish u from v but not i from j. In this article, both distinctions are shown as they are helpful when tracing the origin of English words. See also Latin spelling and pronunciation.

In some Latin verbs, a preposition caused a vowel change in the root of the verb. For example, "capiō" prefixed with "in" becomes "incipio".

References 

Latin words and phrases
Lists of English words of foreign origin